Ralung Monastery, located in the Tsang region of western Tibet south of Karo Pass, is the traditional seat of the Drukpa Lineage of Tibetan Buddhism. It was founded in 1180 by Tsangpa Gyare, 1st Gyalwang Drukpa, a disciple of Lingje Répa who founded the Drukpa Lineage.

Location

The monastery is located in present-day Gyantse County several kilometers south of the road connecting Nakartse and Lungmar, immediately north of the Gasa district of Bhutan.  In previous times, trade could be conducted across the Yak La pass across the high Himalayas, extending the influence of Ralung to the south.

The monastery is surrounded by the towering peaks and glacier fields of Gyetong Soksum (6,244m), Jangzang Lhamo (6,324m) and Nojin Gangzang (7,191m). From the beginning the location was recognized as especially auspicious:

History
The founder of Bhutan, the first Zhabdrung Rinpoche, Ngawang Namgyal, was the 18th abbot of Ralung Monastery. In 1616, he fled Tibet when his recognition as the reincarnation of renowned scholar Kunkhyen Pema Karpo was challenged by the governor of Tsang province. Ngawang Namgyal unified the warring valleys of Bhutan, fending off attacks from Tibet, forming a national identity and establishing a dual system of government that continues to this day in modified form as the Royal Government of Bhutan.

Palden Drukpa lineage
Chart of the hereditary Palden Drukpa lineage of Ralung from the founder, Tsangpa Gyare, to the last hereditary throne holder, Ngawang Namgyal. Successive throne holders are numbered with their names in bold text.

Footnotes

References
 Dorje, Gyurme; (1999). Footprint Tibet Handbook with Bhutan (2nd Ed.) Footprint Handbooks. .  p. 253.

External links
 Ralung Monastery
  rwa lung  TBRC G44
 Ralung

Buddhist monasteries in Tibet
Buddhist temples in Tibet
Drukpa Kagyu monasteries and temples
1180 establishments in Asia
Religious organizations established in the 1180s